Nathan Camargo dos Santos (born 25 July 2005), known as Nathan Camargo or just Nathan, is a Brazilian footballer who plays as a midfielder for Red Bull Bragantino.

Club career
Born in Limeira, São Paulo, Nathan joined Red Bull Brasil's youth setup in 2020, after representing Inter de Limeira and Rio Branco-SP. In 2021, he started to feature for Red Bull Bragantino's youth sides.

Nathan made his professional – and Série A – debut on 14 May 2022, coming on as a second-half substitute for fellow youth graduate Guilherme in a 0–2 away loss against Palmeiras; aged 16 years and nine months, he became the youngest player to play for the side.

Career statistics

References

2005 births
Living people
People from Limeira
Brazilian footballers
Association football midfielders
Campeonato Brasileiro Série A players
Red Bull Bragantino players